Betty St Clair Clay  (née Baden-Powell; 16 April 1917 – 24 April 2004) was the younger daughter of Olave Baden-Powell, the first Chief Guide and Robert Baden-Powell, 1st Baron Baden-Powell, the founder of Scouting. She was the sister of Peter Baden-Powell; the aunt of Robert Baden-Powell, 3rd Baron Baden-Powell, and Michael Baden-Powell, 4th Baron Baden-Powell; the niece of Agnes Baden-Powell and Baden Baden-Powell; niece and goddaughter of Warington Baden-Powell; and granddaughter of the Rev. Prof. Baden Powell.

Career
Clay enrolled in the Brownies as soon as she was old enough. She was educated at Westonbirt School, Gloucestershire and St James' School in Malvern, Worcestershire. While boarding at St James' School, she joined the school's Girl Guide company.

Clay accompanied her parents on many official tours including some overseas, the first of which was the maiden cruise of the  round the Mediterranean and down the West Coast of Africa from 26 January to 8 March 1929; she was 11. They also did a tour of Africa in 1935–36, where she met her husband-to-be on the homeward voyage from Cape Town to England.

Upon her marriage in 1936, Clay moved to Northern Rhodesia, where she became a Cub leader for the pack of which her youngest son was a member, when the leader left. She was an active Guider in Northern Rhodesia, eventually becoming Colony Commissioner for Guides. When the Clays returned to England in 1964, Betty continued her involvement.  In 1978 she was appointed a vice-president of the Guide Association. In 1985 she became a vice-president of the Scout Association.

Clay received from both the Scout and Guide Associations their highest awards for good service: The Silver Wolf from the Scouts in 1984 and a Silver Fish Award from the Guides in 1995. In 1993, she became only the second person ever to be awarded an honorary Gilwell Wood Badge.

Personal life
In 1936, on board ship returning from Africa, Betty met Gervas Clay (16 April 1907 – 18 April 2009), a District Commissioner in Her Majesty's Colonial Service in Northern Rhodesia (present-day Zambia), who was returning to England on leave; they married on 24 September 1936.  Gervas Clay later became Her Majesty's Resident Commissioner of the Barotseland Protectorate, in which capacity,  Gervas and Betty Clay had four children: Gillian, Robin, Nigel, and Crispin. They lived in Northern Rhodesia until they retired to Somerset in 1964.

Honours
She was the holder of the Bronze Wolf from the World Organization of the Scout Movement (WOSM) and a gold Silver Fish in the form of a brooch from the Guide Association.

In 1997 she was made a Commander of the Most Excellent Order of the British Empire (CBE). She attended many Jamborees, including the 4th World Scout Jamboree and 16th World Scout Jamboree and others between.

Death
She died, aged 87, on 24 April 2004, in Elliscombe House Nursing Home, where she was recovering following a fall at home. She was cremated in Yeovil Crematorium, and on Wednesday, 5 May 2004, her ashes (and five years later those of her husband Gervas) were buried in the Churchyard of the Parish Church of St John the Baptist, North Cheriton. A memorial service was held at Wells Cathedral, Somerset, on Monday, 12 July 2004 and was well-attended.

Legacy
The Scout Association's Betty Clay Library is located in Gilwell Park.

See also

References

External links
Photograph of Betty Clay
Photograph of the Baden-Powell family, including Betty in her Brownie uniform (second from right)
Her own WebSite, a family tribute, more biographic details, pictures, and more links

1917 births
2004 deaths
Baden-Powell family
British expatriates in Zambia
Commanders of the Order of the British Empire
Daughters of barons
Place of birth missing
Place of death missing
People educated at Westonbirt School
Recipients of the Bronze Wolf Award
Recipients of the Silver Fish Award
Scouting and Guiding in the United Kingdom